Batocara is a genus of phacopid trilobites in the family Encrinuridae. The type species, B. bowningi, was described originally as Encrinurus bowningi by Foerste in 1888.  In 1980, D.L. Strusz erected Batocara for 'Encrinurus' bowningi.  Batocara also contains the species B. borenorense and B. fritillum.

References

External links
 Batocara at the Paleobiology Database

Encrinuridae genera
Trilobites of Australia
Silurian trilobites